Hesan may refer to:
Heşan, Azerbaijan
Hesan, Iran